The Cordillera Vilcanota (Spanish cordillera: "mountain range", Aymara Willkan Uta or Willkanuta: "house of the sun") is a mountain range located in Peru southeast of Cusco, on the boundary between the regions of Cusco and Puno. It extends between 13°39' and 14°29'S and 70°31' and 71°20'W for about 80 km. It includes 469 glaciers.

To the east the rivers San Gabán and Azángaro are the natural boundary which separates it from the Carabaya range. The La Raya range near the La Raya pass is sometimes included or listed separately.

Toponyms 
Most of the names in the range originate from Quechua and Aymara. They used to be spelled according to a mainly Spanish-based orthography which is incompatible with the normalized spellings of these languages and Law 29735 which regulates the 'use, preservation, development, recovery, promotion and diffusion of the originary languages of Peru'. According to Article 20 of Decreto Supremo No 004-2016-MC (Supreme Decree) which approves the Regulations to Law 29735, published in the official newspaper El Peruano on July 22, 2016, adequate spellings of the toponyms in the normalized alphabets of the indigenous languages must progressively be proposed with the aim of standardizing the namings used by the IGN. The IGN realizes the necessary changes in the official maps of Peru. These changes are part of a process to promote the indigenous languages and to reassert the rights of the indigenous peoples.

Hints to wrong spellings are terms containing hua and hui (instead of wa and wi), "e", "o", "ca", "cu", "qu"  or diphthongs among others.

Mountains 
The highest mountain in the range is Ausangate which is also the fourth largest mountain in Peru. Other notable peaks including the Ayakachi group, the northern extension of the range, are listed below:

 Callangate, 
 Chumpe,  
 Alcamarinayoc,  
 Jatunhuma,  
 Yayamari, 
 Huiscachani,  
 Huila Aje,  
 Japu Punta  
 Jatunñaño Punta  
 Condoriquiña, 
 Joyllor Puñuna,  
 Kiru (or Sallqantay), 
 Awsanqati, 
 Quishuarnioj,  
 Quevesere, 
 Kisu Q'ipina,  
 San Braulio, 
 Iskupitani,  
 Puca Punta,  
 Hualipayoc, 
 Jonorana,  
 Cóndor Tuco, 
 Huayruro Punco,  
 Jolljepunco,  
 Pomanota, 
 Japu Japu, 
 Millo,  
 Uriyuq, 
 Osjollo Anante, 
 Yanajaja,  
 Cinajara, 
 Ayakachi,  
 Pantipata, 
 Quinsachata,  
 Quyllur Rit'i,  
 Apu K'uchu, 
 Santa Catalina, 
 Jatun Quenamari  
 Jatuncucho  
 Istalla, 
 Jarupata,  
 Cuncapata 
 Cuncunani 
 Mullucocha,  
 Pucasalla, 
 Pajo,  
 Ccolcce, 
 Comercocha, 
 Sacsa Ananta, 
 Huasacocha,  
 Jatun Alfapata,  
 Qillita,  
 Waykintani, 
 Jachatira, 
 Pucacocha, 
 Otoroncane, 
 Ananta  
 Chaupimaquito, 
 Chuallani, 
 Uchuy Milla, 
 Jampatune,  
 Aquichua,  
 Cunorana,  
 Quellhuacota, 
 Cochacucho,  
 Quehuesiri,  
 Sanimayo, 
 Sullulluni, 
 Surapata, 
 Suyuparina, 
 Unollocsina,  
 Huisahuisa, 
 Jupucunca, 
 Tocllayoc, 
 Culi, 
 Minasnioc,  
 Huampuni,  
 Ananta, 
 Chullumpina, 
 Hatun Punta,  
 Jatun Sallica, 
 Inkaqucha, 
 Kimsa Chata,  
 Kuntur Sayani, 
 Llusca Ritti (in Corani),  
 Llusca Ritti,  
 Macho Ritti,  
 Pariyuq,  
 Pata Q'ispi Kancha, 
 Pichacani,  
 Jori Pintay,  
 Conatira, 
 Catautira, 
 Runcu Tauja,  
 Sallatira,  
 Sambo, 
 Sayrecucho,  
 Surimani,  
 Taruca Sayana,  
 Tutallipina,  
 Orco Puñuna, 
 Othaña,  
 Waman Lipani, 
 Huamanripayco, 
 Huanacune, 
 Huancane Apacheta, 
 Huarisayana,  
 Viluyo, 
 Hueco, 
 Yanajasa, 
 Culipata, 
 Pucajasa, 
 Cóndor Sallani, 
 Ananta Cucho, 
 Ancahuachana,  
 Ancahuachanan,  
 Chachacumani,  
 Chachacomayoc,  
 Jarjapata,  
 Mamanlipani, 
 Piyacuyani, 
 Quello Cunca,  
 Riticocha, 
 Sallaqucha, 
 Huilacunca, 
 Velacota,  
 Huillopuncho,  
 Yana Orjo,  
 Intijahuana, 
 Alcamarina,  
 Viscachani, 
 Sumpiruni, 
 Comercocha, 
 Quenamari, 
 Piscopata, 
 Sillajata, 
 Yanacocha, 
 Chiajarjapata, 
 Anta Punco, 
 Chachacumani, 
 Chojorusi, 
 Jatunrritioc, 
 Hatun Sallayuq,  
 Hatun Tiyana, 
 Jatunyurac Caca, 
 Illaq Urqu, 
 Kuntur Sayana, 
 Jairani  
 Pata Anjasi,  
 Pirhuani, 
 Pucachuaña, 
 Pisquioc, 
 Collpacaja (Puno),  
 Collpacaca,  
 Colquetauca,  
 Quello Sallayoc,  
 Quello Huallayoc,  
 Q'umirqucha, 
 Riti Huasi,  
 Salla Huancane, 
 Sihuarani, 
 Soracucho, 
 Tarucani, 
 Tocra,  
 Ojecunca, 
 Huillolluni, 
 Yanacucho, 
 Yana Sallayoc,  
 Yana Urqu, 
 Yanaqucha (in Carabaya), 
 Yanacocha (Carabaya-Melgar), 
 Yuracjasa, 
 Yurac Salla, 
 Yurac Huayruro,  
 Chiaraje (Cusco-Puno),  
 Chiaracce (Melgar),  
 Puicutuni,  
 Queullacocha, 
 Jolpajaja,  
 Huayruruni,  
 Huiscana, 
 Chiriunuyoc, 
 Hatun Wayq'u, 
 Huch'uy Ananta, 
 Jaquehuata,  
 Condorsenja, 
 Pirhuane, 
 Pucaparina, 
 Jajachaca, 
 Queljata, 
 Tipajasa,  
 Urqu Puñuna, 
 Waracha, 
 Huayllahuito, 
 Vilapata,  
 Vilacirca 
 Yana Urqu, 
 Yana Urqu, 
 Yuraq Q'asa, 
 Quechajaja, 
 Jollpajaja, 
 Yuracjaja,

Lakes 
Sibinacocha is the largest of about 22 lakes in the range followed by Lake Singrenacocha northwest of it. Other notable lakes are Armaccocha, Jatun Pucacocha, Pucacocha and Huarurumicocha.

References 

Mountain ranges of the Andes
Mountain ranges of Peru
Mountain ranges of Cusco Region
Mountain ranges of Puno Region